The  Data General RDOS (Real-time Disk Operating System) is a real-time operating system released in 1970. The software was bundled with the company's popular Nova and Eclipse minicomputers.

Overview
RDOS is capable of multitasking, with the ability to run up to 32 tasks (similar to the current term threads) simultaneously on each of two grounds (foreground and background) within a 64 KB memory space. Later versions of RDOS are compatible with Data General's 16-bit Eclipse minicomputer line.

A cut-down version of RDOS, without real-time background and foreground capability but still capable of running multiple threads and multi-user Data General Business Basic, is called Data General Diskette Operating System (DG-DOS or now—somewhat confusingly—simply DOS); another related operating system is RTOS, a Real-Time Operating System for diskless environments.  RDOS on microNOVA-based "Micro Products" micro-minicomputers is sometimes called DG/RDOS.

RDOS was superseded in the early 1980s by Data General's AOS family of operating systems, including AOS/VS and MP/AOS (MP/OS on smaller systems).

Commands
The following list of commands are supported by the RDOS/DOS CLI.

 ALGOL
 APPEND
 ASM
 BASIC
 BATCH
 BOOT
 BPUNCH
 BUILD
 CCONT
 CDIR
 CHAIN
 CHATR
 CHLAT
 CLEAR
 CLG
 COPY
 CPART
 CRAND
 CREATE
 DEB
 DELETE
 DIR
 DISK
 DUMP
 EDIT
 ENDLOG
 ENPAT
 EQUIV
 EXFG
 FDUMP
 FGND
 FILCOM
 FLOAD
 FORT
 FORTRAN
 FPRINT
 GDIR
 GMEM
 GSYS
 GTOD
 INIT
 LDIR
 LFE
 LINK
 LIST
 LOAD
 LOG
 MAC
 MCABOOT
 MDIR
 MEDIT
 MESSAGE
 MKABS
 MKSAVE
 MOVE
 NSPEED
 OEDIT
 OVLDR
 PATCH
 POP
 PRINT
 PUNCH
 RDOSSORT
 RELEASE
 RENAME
 REPLACE
 REV
 RLDR
 SAVE
 SDAY
 SEDIT
 SMEM
 SPDIS
 SPEBL
 SPEED
 SPKILL
 STOD
 SYSGEN
 TPRINT
 TUOFF
 TUON
 TYPE
 VFU
 XFER

Antitrust lawsuit
In the late 1970s, Data General was sued (under the Sherman and Clayton antitrust acts) by competitors for their practice of bundling RDOS with the Data General Nova or Eclipse minicomputer. When Data General introduced the Data General Nova, a company called Digidyne wanted to use its RDOS operating system on its own hardware clone. Data General refused to license their software and claimed their "bundling rights". In 1985, courts including the United States Court of Appeals for the Ninth Circuit ruled against Data General in a case called Digidyne v. Data General. The Supreme Court of the United States declined to hear Data General's appeal, although Justices White and Blackmun would have heard it. The precedent set by the lower courts eventually forced Data General to license the operating system because restricting the software to only Data General's hardware was an illegal tying arrangement.

In 1999, Data General was taken over by EMC Corporation.

References

External links
RDOS documentation at the Computer History Museum
RDOS 7.50 User Parameters definition
SimuLogics' ReNOVAte - Emulator to run NOVA/Eclipse Software on DOS / WindowsNT / UN*X / VMS

Data General
Disk operating systems
Real-time operating systems